The 1930 Dhaka riots was an anti-Hindu communal violence involving loot and arson.

Events 
On the night of 9 June, a nearly 1,000 strong Muslim crowd cried that the Hindus had tried to set their houses on fire. The revenge against the fictitious attack was taken on the night of 10 June. The miscreants set fire to the timber go-down adjoining the residence of Shyam Chand Basak, a well to do businessman from Nawabpur.

Attack on Kayettuli 

In the neighbourhood of Kayettuli, the residence of Prasanna Kumar Nandi was attacked. Nandi was out of station. His eldest son Bhabesh Chandra Nandi had been arrested a few days earlier by the Imperial British police. At the time of the attack, only the female members of the family were present, barring the youngest son, who was a minor. The attack of a 300 strong armed Muslim mob was staved off for 45 minutes by two minor daughters Amiyabala and Anindyabala.

Looting in nearby villages 
When rioting started in Dhaka city, the nearby villages were looted as well. The Muslims came from far off villages, in country boats and looted in broad daylight. The families belonging to the Bengali Hindu trading castes were the worst affected. The Hindu men, women and children took refuge in the nearby jute fields to save their lives. In the village of Ruhitpur, Muslim men and women from the neighbouring villages as well as Ruhitpur village itself, took part in looting the Hindu houses.  About 200 Hindu households were looted.  Hundreds of Muslim men and women and even children aged ten to twelve years took part in the looting.  They looted every movable article in the houses, including the wooden doors and in one or two cases, the corrugated iron sheets used for roofing. They dug up the ground and searched the bottom of the ponds, every nook and corner of the homestead, where valuable household articles like bell metal utensils may have been hidden. In one case, a dhenki was looted.

Investigation 
Two independent committees were set up for investigating into the disturbances, one by the government and other by the citizens of Dhaka. Many people, including eminent citizens of Dhaka deposed before the latter committee. The eminent citizens included P. Haldar of Government Women's Teacher Training School, Tapas Ranjan Bandyopadhyay of Dhaka Jana Samiti, Rajani Kanta Basak, the Direct of Dhakeshwari Cotton Mills and Surendranath Bhattacharya, retired police inspector. The witnesses stated that the Deputy Superintendent of Police was seen going around the city in company of 300 to 400 Muslim goons.  P. Haldar witnessed Muslims looting shops near her school and  saw police constables taking part in the looting.

References

Further reading 
 Bengal Partition Stories: An Unclosed Chapter
 Carving blocs: communal ideology in early twentieth-century Bengal

Persecution of Bengali Hindus
1930 in India
1930 riots
Bengal Presidency
20th century in Dhaka
20th-century Hinduism
June 1930 events
Religiously motivated violence in Bangladesh